Sir George Strickland, 7th Baronet (26 May 1782 – 23 December 1874), also known as Sir George Cholmley was an English Member of Parliament and lawyer. He took the name Cholmley to succeed to the Cholmley estates in 1865.

Life
Strickland was the second son of Sir William Strickland, 6th Baronet, of Boynton in Yorkshire, but his older brother died before him and he inherited the baronetcy on his father's death in 1834. Strickland inherited Boynton Hall and was Lord of the Manor of Wintringham.

Strickland began his career in the law, being called to the Bar in 1810, and practised as a barrister on the Northern Circuit. However, he took an interest in politics, supporting the Whigs and being an ardent supporter of Parliamentary reform and an early advocate of the secret ballot.

In 1830, at the height of the agitation over the Great Reform Bill, he stood for Parliament in the by-election for Yorkshire that followed Brougham's appointment as Lord Chancellor, but was defeated by another Whig. However, at the general election the following year both men were returned unopposed, and Strickland helped vote the Reform Bill into law. His own Yorkshire constituency was divided under the 1832 Reform Act, and he stood and was elected for the West Riding in 1832, which he continued to represent until 1841. In 1840 he attended the World Anti-Slavery Convention in London as a corresponding member of the society.

In 1841, he was instead elected member for Preston, a constituency he served for a further sixteen years. He remained a reforming member throughout his career, also advocating church reform and relief for dissenters.

Strickland was a well known breeder of racehorses. He lived mainly at Boynton, though his address is recorded as Hildenley in his return as MP for Yorkshire in 1831. In 1844 it seems to have been his opposition that was the principal objection to a projected railway joining Bridlington and York, proposed by George Hudson, which would have passed through Boynton; the railway was never built.

In 1865, he inherited from Nathaniel Cholmley extensive estates at Whitby, Howsham and North Elmsall. In accordance with the terms of Cholmley's will, Strickland adopted by Royal Licence the surname Cholmley and the arms of Cholmley and Wentworth in place of his own and lived the remaining nine years of his life as Sir George Cholmley. On his death in 1874, however, his eldest son and heir Charles reverted to the Strickland surname and arms.

Marriage and children
Strickland married Mary Constable, daughter of the Reverend Charles Constable of Wassand in 1818. They had three sons and at least one daughter.
Charles, the eldest son, succeeded to the baronetcy was one of the first winners at Henley Royal Regatta.
 Frederick, the middle son, was friends with Francis Galton and whose death on 19 October 1849—from hypothermia after falling in a stream and getting lost on his snowy October descent from Mount Washington, New Hampshire—Galton described
 Lucy Henrietta Strickland (1822–8 July 1871), daughter, married, on 19 December 1844, to James Marriott (died 10 October 1871).
 Henry, the youngest son, by whom are descended the Strickland-Constables of Wassand who now hold the baronetcy, which they inherited after the direct Strickland line failed in 1938.

References

Sources
 Memorial inscription, Boynton Church, Yorkshire 
 A Gooder (ed.) The Parliamentary Representation of Yorkshire, 1258-1832 (Yorkshire Archaeological Society, Record Series, 1935)
 J Holladay Philbin, Parliamentary Representation 1832 - England and Wales (New Haven: Yale University Press, 1965)
 M Stenton (ed.), Who's Who of British Members of Parliament, Volume I: 1832-1885 (Hassocks: Harvester Press, 1976)
 Victoria County History of the East Riding of Yorkshire

External links
 

|-

1782 births
1874 deaths
Members of the Parliament of the United Kingdom for English constituencies
Strickland, Sir George, 7th Baronet
UK MPs 1831–1832
UK MPs 1832–1835
UK MPs 1835–1837
UK MPs 1837–1841
UK MPs 1841–1847
UK MPs 1847–1852
UK MPs 1852–1857